Megacraspedus alfacarellus is a moth of the family Gelechiidae. It was described by Wehrli in 1926. It is found in Spain.

References

Moths described in 1926
Megacraspedus